Arthur J. Hubbard Sr. (January 23, 1912 – February 7, 2014) was an American state senator from Arizona, who served as a Navajo Code Talker instructor in World War II.

Life
Hubbard was born in 1912 on the Tohono O'odham Nation in Topawa, Arizona Territory, on January 23, 1912, about three weeks before Arizona became a state. He grew up in Ganado, Arizona, which is part of the Navajo Nation, and studied at the University of Arizona. He was the leader of a Navajo tribal band, as a trombone player and singer.

From 1939 to 1945 Hubbard voluntarily served in the U. S. Marine Corps. During World War II, he was a Navajo Code Talker instructor training over 200 men to transmit coded messages using the Navajo language. After his military duties, the then Governor Jack Williams appointed him Director of Indian Development District of Arizona. In 1972 he became state senator in Arizona, serving for 12 years until 1984. This made him the first Native American senator in the Arizona State Legislature. His other work includes serving as a water rights advisor to the Tohono O'odham Nation, and as a Navajo culture and language instructor at Arizona State University. He also played an important part in the establishment of Diné College (originally known as Navajo Community College), which was the first college established within the Navajo Nation.

Hubbard was inducted into the Arizona Veterans Hall of Fame and the Arizona Democratic Party Hall of Fame. He received the Navajo Code Talker Congressional Silver Medal in 2000. He died at age 102 on February 7, 2014, in Phoenix, Arizona. On his death, flags across the Navajo Nation were flown at half-staff in his honor.

References

1912 births
2014 deaths
People from Pima County, Arizona
Military personnel from Arizona
University of Arizona alumni
Arizona State University faculty
Navajo people
Democratic Party Arizona state senators
American centenarians
Men centenarians
Navajo code talkers
Tohono O'odham people
People from Ganado, Arizona
20th-century Native Americans
21st-century Native Americans
Native American people from Arizona